Boris Akhsarbekovic Makojev (born January 22, 1993, in Ossetia) is a naturalized Slovak freestyle wrestler of Russian origins and Ossetian ethnicity who competes at 86 kilograms. In March 2021, he competed at the European Qualification Tournament in Budapest, Hungary hoping to qualify for the 2020 Summer Olympics in Tokyo, Japan.

In 2022, he won one of the bronze medals in his event at the Matteo Pellicone Ranking Series 2022 held in Rome, Italy. He won one of the bronze medals in the men's 86kg event at the 2022 World Wrestling Championships held in Belgrade, Serbia.

References

External links
 

1993 births
Living people
People from Vladikavkaz
Slovak male sport wrestlers
World Wrestling Championships medalists
Wrestlers at the 2020 Summer Olympics
Olympic wrestlers of Slovakia